QED: Question, Explore, Discover (also called QEDcon or simply QED) is an annual skeptical conference held in Manchester, England. QED is organised by North West Skeptical Events Ltd (NWSE), a volunteer-owned non-profit organisation originating from a collaboration between the Merseyside Skeptics Society and the Greater Manchester Skeptics Society.

History 

Starting in February 2011 the Merseyside Skeptics Society, in conjunction with the Greater Manchester Skeptics Society, began organising and presenting an annual two-day skeptical science festival, QED: Question, Explore, Discover.

The master of ceremonies for the first QED was George Hrab. Notable speakers included Steven Novella and Eugenie Scott, and episodes of three podcasts, InKredulous, The Pod Delusion, and Strange Quarks, were recorded live during the event. In an article about the first QED conference on the Committee for Skeptical Inquiry website, Kylie Sturgess said, "The organisers of QEDCon didn't need to proclaim the success of their convention from the stage — it was evident from the beginning to the end." The conference was part of the 2011 10:23 Campaign, with The Challenge culminating in a homeopathic overdose on Belladonna by 350 participants of QED.

By 2016, QED had grown out to 650 attendees, with multiple simultaneous sessions in various formats, covering a wide range of topics "from ethics in magic to evolutionary biology to effective science communication and everything in between." Incumbent ECSO President Claire Klingenberg formerly described QED as "a very high-energy event", where "both the audience and the speakers are on average young and very active in their fields of interest." She said there were "so many brilliant people mulling around and simply not enough time to see and do everything, which makes you want to come back next year."

October 2018 QED event was the largest conference to date. The weekend was hosted by Helen Arney, along with speakers from around the world including; Steven Novella, Chris French and Michael Marshall, giving presentations on topics such as the fallacies of the wellness industry and the history of poltergeists.
Alex Moshakis from The Observer, attending QED 2018, found the "underlining message related more to the skeptical process: how to become a more effective critical thinker".

Setup 

QED is organised by volunteers, and any proceeds go back into future events or to charities. In the first year, these charities were Sense about Science and the National Autistic Society. On the Token Skeptic podcast, co-organiser Michael Marshall ("Marsh") commented:
How we try to always pitch it and how we try and run it is – it's all about the skeptical community. Because it's being run by people who are just part of that community who are doing this because we really love it, the atmosphere, seems to be, of people coming together. It's kind of a big party, a celebration of UK skepticism and also international skepticism.

QED formally comprises two days, a Saturday and a Sunday. It is preceded by so-called "fringe events", with a Skeptics in the Pub event on Thursday night, a SkeptiCamp on Friday morning and afternoon, following by a pub quiz, and finally an informal socialising event known as the "QED Mixer". The fringe events are free to attend and do not require a QED ticket.

The general setup of the QED agenda is to have several main speakers who give lectures and workshops, live podcasts and panel discussions, alternated with in-depth sessions that most often run in parallel. Some documentary films about scientific skepticism are screened, with Science Moms (2017) having had its world premiere at QED. Many sessions are filmed, and can be viewed on YouTube afterwards. On Saturday night, several social events are organised, such as a gala dinner, magic and comedy shows, and the Ockham Award ceremony.

The Skeptic magazine annually awards the Ockham Awards, or simply the Ockhams, at QED. This occurred for the first time in 2012, and the award ceremony has been considered a highlight of the conference ever since. The Ockhams were introduced by editor-in-chief Deborah Hyde to "recognise the effort and time that have gone into the community’s favourite skeptical blogs, skeptical podcasts, skeptical campaigns and outstanding contributors to the skeptical cause."

The name refers to Ockham's razor, formulated by English philosopher William of Ockham (c. 1285–1347). The trophies, designed by Neil Davies and Karl Derrick, carry the upper text "Ockham's" and the lower text "The Skeptic. Shaving away unnecessary assumptions since 1285." Between the texts, there is an image of a double-edged safety razorblade, and both lower corners feature an image of William of Ockham's face.

Events

Notes

References

External links 

 
 
 

Skeptic conferences
Annual events in England
Events in Greater Manchester
Education in Manchester
Entertainment in Manchester
Recurring events established in 2011